Adrián Hernández may refer to:

 Adrián Hernández (baseball, born 1975), former professional baseball pitcher
 Adrián Hernández (baseball, born 2000), Mexican professional baseball pitcher
 Adrián Hernández (boxer) (born 1988), Mexican boxer
 Pollo (footballer) (Adrián José Hernández, born 1983), Spanish footballer

See also
 Adriano Hernandez (1870–1925), Filipino revolutionary